Noel Ahern (born 28 December 1944) is a former Irish Fianna Fáil politician. He served as a Teachta Dála (TD) for the Dublin North-West constituency from 1992 to 2011. He also served as the Minister of State at the Department of Transport with special responsibility for Road Safety from May 2008 to April 2009.

Early and personal life
Born in Drumcondra, Dublin, he was educated at the Christian Brothers O'Connell School, Dublin, University College Dublin and the College of Commerce, Rathmines. He worked as an official with CIÉ before becoming a politician. Ahern is a brother of the former Taoiseach and Fianna Fáil leader, Bertie Ahern and younger brother of former Lord Mayor of Dublin Maurice Ahern.

Political career
He was elected to Dublin City Council in 1985. At the 1992 general election he was elected to Dáil Éireann and was re-elected in every subsequent election until his retirement in 2011.

Between 1994 and 1997, Ahern served as Opposition spokesman on the Environment with special responsibility for Housing. In 1997, he served as Chairman of the Oireachtas All Party Dáil Committee on Social Community and Family Affairs. In 2002, he was appointed as Minister of State at the Department of the Environment, Heritage and Local Government, with responsibility for Housing and Urban Renewal, and at the Department of Community, Rural and Gaeltacht Affairs, with responsibility for Drugs Strategy and Community Affairs. After the 2007 general election, he was appointed as Minister of State at the Department of Finance with special responsibility for the Office of Public Works.

In May 2008, after Brian Cowen became Taoiseach, he was appointed Minister of State at the Department of Transport with special responsibility for Road Safety. In April 2009, Ahern resigned along with all junior ministers, at the request of the Taoiseach, and was not reappointed.

Housing affordability controversy
Ahern created controversy in June 2006 when, as minister responsible for housing, he claimed that there were many affordable new houses available in Dublin under €200,000. He was quoted as saying there was 'a tendency to get carried away' with the average house price.

Later in that year, Ahern again drew criticism when he described the four interest rate increases up to August 2006 as 'painless' for borrowers.

Retirement
In January 2011, he announced that he would not be contesting the 2011 general election. He receives an annual pension payment of €70,233.

References

	

1944 births
Living people
Noel
People educated at O'Connell School
Alumni of Dublin Institute of Technology
Alumni of University College Dublin
Fianna Fáil TDs
Local councillors in Dublin (city)
Members of the 27th Dáil
Members of the 28th Dáil
Members of the 29th Dáil
Members of the 30th Dáil
Ministers of State of the 29th Dáil
Ministers of State of the 30th Dáil
Politicians from Dublin (city)